Maar Shamarin  is a Syrian village located in Maarrat al-Nu'man Nahiyah in Maarrat al-Nu'man District, Idlib.  According to the Syria Central Bureau of Statistics (CBS), Maar Shamarin had a population of 3625 in the 2004 census.

References 

Populated places in Maarat al-Numan District